Glokaya kuzdra is a reference to a Russian language phrase constructed from non-existent words in a grammatically proper way, similar to the English language phrases using the pseudoword "gostak". It was suggested by Russian linguist Lev Shcherba. The full phrase is: "". In the phrase, all word stems (-, -, -, -, -) are meaningless, but all affixes are real, used in a grammatically correct way and — which is the point — provide enough semantics for the phrase to be a perceived description of some dramatic action with a specified plot but with unknown actors. A very rough English translation (considering no semantic information is available) could be: "The glocky kuzdra shteckly budled the bocker and is kurdyaking the bockerling."

Shcherba used it in his lectures in linguistics to emphasise the importance of grammar in acquiring foreign languages. The phrase was popularized by Lev Uspensky in his popular science book A Word about Words.

See also
 Jabberwocky
 Colorless green ideas sleep furiously
 Wug Test

References

Russian words and phrases
Semantics